
"White choco" is Ai Otsuka's second (18th overall) single under the avex trax label under her pen name Love, which was released on November 21, 2007.

"White Choco" is the second single that Ai has released about a bunny named Love and under her pen name Love. "White Choco" is a previously unreleased song on her "Momo no hanabira" promotional disc originally entitled "Whiteチョコ" (White Chocolate; White Choko). The single peaked at 78 on the Oricon weekly chart and charted for two weeks.

Track listing 
CD
 White choco
 White choco -instrumental-

DVD
 White choco [Music Clip]

Charts 
Oricon Sales Chart (Japan)

References

External links 
Ai Otsuka's LOVE official website

Ai Otsuka songs
2007 singles
2007 songs
Avex Trax singles
Songs written by Ai Otsuka